Guam  competed at the 2014 Summer Youth Olympics, in Nanjing, China from 16 August to 28 August 2014.

Basketball

Guam qualified a girls' team based on the 1 June 2014 FIBA 3x3 National Federation Rankings.

Skills Competition

Girls' Tournament

Roster
 Kali Benavente
 Felicia Borja
 Destiny Castro
 Dyonii Quitugua

Group Stage

Round of 16

Golf

Guam was given a team of 2 athletes to compete from the Tripartite Commission.

Individual

Team

Judo

Guam was given a quota to compete by the tripartite committee.

Individual

Wrestling

Guam qualified one athlete based on its performance at the 2014 Oceania Cadet Championships.

Girls

References

2014 in Guamanian sports
Nations at the 2014 Summer Youth Olympics
Guam at the Youth Olympics